Possum Kingdom State Park is a state park in Palo Pinto County, Texas, USA, that was built in the 1940s by Civilian Conservation Corps Company 2888 and opened to the public in 1950. The park borders the large Possum Kingdom Lake, a  lake known for its clear blue waters. A privately owned store and marina in the park cater to boaters and campers.

The Boy Scouts of America have a summer camp "Constantin" on the shores of Possum Kingdom Lake as does the YMCA at camp "Grady Spruce".

Camp Grady Spruce is directly across from the most well known geological feature of the lake called "Hell's Gate", a channel which cuts between an island and a row of cliffs.

The title of the song "Possum Kingdom" by Toadies is derived from Possum Kingdom State Park.

On April 15, 2011, the park was closed due to wildfires, and was reopened on May 25, 2011.

Due to Texas' severe drought, another breakout of wildfires that began on August 30, 2011 plagued the Possum Kingdom Lake area. The fires burned into September, and though the park was not damaged, 39 homes and 9 recreation vehicles were destroyed.

References

External links

 
 Possum Kingdom State Park Texas Parks and Wildlife
 PK lake 2011 FIRES webpage
Home movie of Possum Kingdom State Park (1972), home movie, Texas Archive of the Moving Image

State parks of Texas
Protected areas of Palo Pinto County, Texas
Civilian Conservation Corps in Texas